Wetton/Downes (sometimes stylised as Wetton-Downes or Wetton & Downes, though the album is given no official title) is the first album released by Asia member Geoff Downes and former Asia member John Wetton, and is a precursor to their Icon series.  It is essentially a collection of (previously unreleased) demo tracks, mostly recorded during Asia's hiatus in the late 1980s through the time of their brief reformation in 1990. In September 2017, Downes announced (via his Twitter account) the re-release of this title, with remastered sound and additional tracks, as Icon Zero on Epicon Records.

Track listing

Personnel
Geoffrey Downes - keyboards, programming
John Wetton - lead guitar, bass, lead vocals
Scott Gorham - guitar on "Kari-Anne"
Francis Dunnery - guitar solo on "Kari-Anne"
Mike Sturgis - drums on "Kari-Anne"
Agnetha Fältskog - vocals on "We Move As One"

Production
Produced By Wetton/Downes

References 

John Wetton albums
2002 albums
Demo albums
Albums produced by Geoff Downes